John Edward Bazille-Corbin (né Corbin, October 9, 1887- April 30, 1964) was an English attorney, Anglo-Catholic priest, liturgist, antiquarian, and author active in monarchist activities. Corbin was born in Saint Peter Port, Guernsey, the Channel Islands. He was consecrated as an episcopus vagans. He was ordained to the priesthood in the Church of England in 1921 and served as rector of Runwell St. Mary, where he developed a devotion to a holy well as a pilgrimage site, from 1923 to 1961. In 1943 he became the founder and first warden of the Monarchist League. He was a proponent of the Sarum Use in liturgical practice.

In April 1948, Bazille-Corbin was consecrated to the episcopate by independent bishop Hugh George de Willmott Newman of the Catholicate of the West. Bazille-Corbin assumed the title of "Mar Marcus Valerius, Titular Bishop of Selsey in the Eparchy of All the Britons" and was also chancellor in the Catholicate of the West. He was also identified as a "Rector-Provincial for Canterbury" in the revived Order of Corporate Reunion.

According to the Church Times (London), "Bazille Corbin collected titles as a hobby .. but as Mar Marcus Valerius he never claimed territorial jurisdiction beyond the boundaries of his parish, and, so far as is known, never made use of his episcopal powers for ordinations. He was an eccentric but much-loved Anglican clergyman."

He died at Writtle, Essex. His will was admitted to probate at Ipswich on March 4, 1965.

Orders and decorations
Order of the Crown of Thorns
Imperial Order of St. Eugene of Trebizond

Works
The Order for the Celebration of Low Mass according to the Use of the Illustrious Church of Salisbury (1951)
Toward a Uniate Rite (1952)
Notes, Historical, Liturgical and Practical, for the Guidance of the Priest at Low Mass (1953)
Runwell S. Mary: A Farrago of History, Archaeology, Legend and Folk-lore, Collected and Pieced together during an Incumbency of Many Years (no date)

Sources
Crockford's Clerical Directory 1921-1964
Obituary, The Church Times, May 15, 1964
Le Crépuscule de la chevalerie (1975)
Gary L. Ward, Bertil Persson, Alan Bain, Independent Bishops: An International Directory (Apogee, 1990) 
James Rattue, The Living Stream: Holy Wells in Historical Context (2001)

External links
Members of the San Luigi Orders: The Most Revd. J.E. Bazille-Corbin

1887 births
1964 deaths
Anglican liturgists
20th-century English Anglican priests
20th-century English writers
English male writers
Guernsey people
Alumni of Jesus College, Oxford
Alumni of Cuddesdon College